Łazy  is a village in the administrative district of Gmina Koszęcin, within Lubliniec County, Silesian Voivodeship, in southern Poland.

The village has a population of 156.

References

Villages in Lubliniec County